"Just Like a Pill" is a song by American singer Pink. It was written by Pink and Dallas Austin and produced by the latter for the singer's second studio album, Missundaztood. The lyrics of the song deal with getting out of painful relationships, with a subtheme about drug abuse.

The song was released worldwide as the third single from Missundaztood in June 2002 and was a commercial success, peaking at number eight on the Billboard Hot 100 in the United States. It also performed well internationally, reaching number one on the UK Singles Chart and peaking within the top 10 in 12 additional countries.

Background and composition
"Just like a Pill" was written by Pink and Dallas Austin, who also produced and arranged the song. Pink said in an interview that the song shows "part of who I am", referring to her documented problems with drugs.

"Just like a Pill" is set in the key of A major with a moderate pop-rock tempo in common time. The song follows a chord progression of A–Fm–D–E, and Pink's vocals span from E3 to C5.

Reception

Critical response
The song was generally well received by contemporary music critics. NME called it "the third best track off her killer last album". Drowned In Sound's Robert Luckett commented that it is "a fascinating record...this is a record with a[n] edge, a kind of pot boiling over at any moment, ready to go off at any time vibe." He also wrote "it obeys the pop industry's well-dusted rules for a hit." Stylus Magazine's Todd Burns, in his review of the album, compared "Just like a Pill" to the other singles from the album, "Don't Let Me Get Me" and "Get the Party Started", writing "The guitars... sound much more integrated into the work and the overall song works far better."

The song was shortlisted by Digital Spy as a nominee for the best single of 2002, finishing third in the vote to Red Hot Chili Peppers' "By the Way" and Liberty X's "Just a Little".

Chart performance
In the UK, the song scored Pink her second number-one single in that country, whilst peaking at number two in Austria, Ireland and New Zealand, and within the top 10 in many countries across the world including Sweden, the Netherlands, Norway and Belgium. It peaked at number eight on the Billboard Hot 100. In Australia, the song was a radio-only single in hopes of rising album sales. Although it was a number-one radio hit, a physical release never eventuated; however, it did appear as the B-side to the Australian release of "Family Portrait". In late June 2009, the song charted at number 97 on downloads, most likely due to Pink's national tour.

Music video
The video for "Just like a Pill" was directed by Francis Lawrence for LaFace Records. The video is considerably different from Pink's previous videos. "Get the Party Started" and "Don't Let Me Get Me" were lighter in nature than the dark atmosphere which is reflected in the video for "Just like a Pill", an example of which is the fact that Pink can be seen throughout the whole video wearing black outfits with naked arms and legs and wearing black hair. Commenting on the different style of video, Pink said: "This one's very dark and artsy, and I have black hair, which is very fun. I loved it. It's another part that I haven't concentrated on before."

In the first scene, Pink lies on the floor. In the chorus she sings in front of her band. She is also featured in another scene with white rabbits around her in a room, and in another scene, she is seen with an elephant. There are also scenes with Pink singing in front of and amongst various people. In the latter half of the video, she runs in a hall whilst lip-synching the song, before disappearing into a bright doorway atop a staircase at the conclusion of the video.

After the elephant scene Pink decided to stop using animals for her videos. In an interview, she explained: "This poor elephant...a huge elephant, it's so cute, and I could see how painful it was for it to get down on its hands and knees, ... I didn't like it. I won't do that again. [...] No more animals."

Track listings

 US CD single
 "Just Like a Pill" (album version) – 3:57
 "Just Like a Pill" (instrumental) – 3:52
 "Don't Let Me Get Me" (Ernie Lake Ext. Club.vox) – 5:49

 Canadian CD single
 "Just Like a Pill" (main) – 3:57
 "M!ssundaztood" – 3:36

 UK CD and cassette single
 "Just Like a Pill" (radio version) – 3:57
 "Just Like a Pill" (Jacknife Lee Remix) – 3:46
 "Get the Party Started" (live at La Scala) – 3:17

 European CD single
 "Just Like a Pill" (radio edit) – 3:57
 "Just Like a Pill" (Jacknife Lee Remix) – 3:46

Credits and personnel
Credits are taken from the Missundaztood album booklet.

Studios
 Recorded at Pinetree Studios (Miami Beach, Florida)
 Mixed at Larrabee Studios North (North Hollywood, California)
 Mastered at Hit Factory Mastering (New York City)

Personnel

 Pink – writing, vocals, background vocals
 Dallas Austin – writing, production, arrangement
 Carlton Lynn – recording
 Doug Harms – recording assistant
 Kevin "KD" Davis – mixing
 Rick Sheppard – MIDI and sound design
 Herb Powers Jr. – mastering

Charts and certifications

Weekly charts

Year-end charts

Certifications

Release history

See also
 List of number-one singles from the 2000s (UK)

References

2001 songs
2002 singles
Cascada songs
Music videos directed by Francis Lawrence
Number-one singles in Scotland
Pink (singer) songs
Song recordings produced by Dallas Austin
Songs about drugs
Songs written by Dallas Austin
Songs written by Pink (singer)
UK Singles Chart number-one singles